Staphisagria is a genus in the family Ranunculaceae. It used to be a subgenus or section in the genus Delphinium, but molecular evidence suggests it should be a genus. However, the separation is not accepted by other sources, which treat Staphisagria as a synonym of Delphinium.

Species list 
There are three species in Staphisagria:

Staphisagria macrosperma Spach = Delphinium staphisagria L.
Staphisagria requienii (DC.) Spach = Delphinium requienii DC.
Staphisagria picta (Willd.) Jabbour = Delphinium pictum Willd.

Or two, as some botanists think S. requienii and S. picta should be united as one species, with S. picta treated as S. requienii subsp. picta.

See also 
 Aconitum
 Delphinium

References 

 
Delphinieae
Medicinal plants
Ranunculaceae genera